Gay Street Historic District is a national historic district in Baltimore, Maryland, United States. It is a notable example of a late-19th and early-20th century commercial corridor in a developing urban area.  It includes a high concentration of small-scale commercial buildings or light manufacturing enterprise structures.  It contains buildings displaying Victorian Eclectic, Beaux Arts, Italianate, and Romanesque elements, including two full-front, cast-iron buildings.

It was added to the National Register of Historic Places in 2003.

References

External links
, including photo dated 2003, at Maryland Historical Trust
Boundary Map of the Gay Street Historic District, Baltimore City, at Maryland Historical Trust

Historic districts on the National Register of Historic Places in Baltimore
Cast-iron architecture in Baltimore
Beaux-Arts architecture in Maryland
Victorian architecture in Maryland
Italianate architecture in Maryland
Federal architecture in Maryland
Romanesque Revival architecture in Maryland